A  list of the most recent films produced in Azerbaijan ordered by year of release in the 2010s:

2010s

External links
 Azerbaijani film at the Internet Movie Database
 Azerbaycan Kinosu

2010
Azerbai
Films